P30 or P-30 may refer to:

Automobiles 
 BRM P30, a British racing car
 Toyota Publica (P30), a Japanese subcompact car

Military 
 Consolidated P-30, a fighter aircraft of the United States Army Air Corps
 , a ship of the Ghana Navy
 Maltese patrol boat P30
 Grendel P30, an American pistol in production 1990–1994
 Heckler & Koch P30, a German pistol in production since 2006
 , a corvette of the Indian Navy
 P-30 radar, a Soviet radar system

Science 
 p30 (protein), an actin-binding protein
 Phosphorus-30, an isotope of phosphorus
 Pioneer P-30, a failed space probe
 Prostate specific antigen

Smartphones 
 BenQ P30, introduced in 2004
 Huawei P30, introduced in 2019

Other uses 
 P30 (Latvia), a regional road
 Papyrus 30, a biblical manuscript

See also
 P3O, with a letter O instead of a zero